Fernando Prieto Martínez (1933 – Madrid, November 2006) was a Spanish political scientist, professor of the History of Ideas, and director of the Centro de Estudios Políticos y Constitucionales.

In 1974, he became a professor with the Faculty of Political Science and Sociology at the Complutense University of Madrid. He had planned to establish himself as a researcher when Prime Minister Adolfo Suárez asked him to convert an old Francoist organization (the Instituto de Estudios Políticos) into a modern think-tank that would help Spain achieve its transition to Democracy. The organization was renamed and Prieto became its first director.

Upon leaving the directorship, Prieto returned to the academic world. He became especially well known for his studies of Seneca and Hegel. He was the president of the "Coordinadora Estatal para la Reforma de la Ley Electoral" (CERLE), an organization devoted to promoting participatory democracy and increasing citizen involvement in the legislative process.

Selected works
La Revolución Francesa, Istmo (1989) 
Manual de Historia de las Teorías Politicas, Union Editorial 
Historia de las Ideas y Formas Políticas, 5 vols., Union Editorial. Vol.1, Edad Antigua ; Vol.2, Edad Media ; Vol.3, Edad Moderna ; Vol.4, Edad Contemporanea (El Romanticismo) ; Vol.5, Edad Contemporanea (El Positivismo)

References

1933 births
2006 deaths
Spanish political scientists
20th-century political scientists